Nawegaonbandh Dam, is an earthfill dam on local river near Navegaon, Gondia district in the state of Maharashtra in India.

Specifications

Purpose
 Irrigation

See also
 Dams in Maharashtra
 List of reservoirs and dams in India

References

Dams in Gondia district
Dams completed in 1967
1967 establishments in Maharashtra